Cat Aviation AG is a charter airline based in Kloten, Switzerland. The company was founded in 1987 by Helene Niedhart and is still managed by her today.

Fleet
The Cat Aviation fleet includes the following aircraft (as of September 2020):

References

External links

Official website

Airlines of Switzerland
Airlines established in 1987
Swiss companies established in 1987
Kloten